The 2016 Atlantic 10 Conference men's soccer season was the 30th season of men's varsity soccer in the conference.

The George Washington Colonials and Dayton Flyers are the defending regular season and tournament champions, respectively. The Saint Louis Billikens won the regular season and the Fordham Rams won the tournament.

Changes from 2015 

 On July 28, 2016, Rob Irvine was hired as the head coach for La Salle.

Teams

Stadia and locations 

 Richmond does not sponsor men's soccer

Personnel

Regular season

Results

Rankings

Honors and awards 
Player of the Week

Postseason

A10 tournament

NCAA tournament

All-A10 awards and teams

See also 
 2016 NCAA Division I men's soccer season
 2016 Atlantic 10 Men's Soccer Tournament
 2016 Atlantic 10 Conference women's soccer season

Notes 
A : St. Louis hosted VCU on Sept. 20, 2016. The match ended in a 1–1 draw, but did not count as a conference match.

References 

 
2016 NCAA Division I men's soccer season